Tykhin Baybuza was a Registered Cossacks Senior (1597–1598). 

He was born in Cherkasy to Ukrainian boyar Mykhaylo Baybuza-Hrybunovych and grandson of Ografena Glinsky.

During the Cossack rebellion of 1596, he was in the Polish army. When being Hetman, Baybuza carried out politics peaceful towards the Polish–Lithuanian Government.

See also
Hetmans of Ukrainian Cossacks

References

Year of birth unknown
Year of death unknown
Hetmans of the Zaporozhian Cossacks
Ukrainian nobility
Ruthenian nobility of the Polish–Lithuanian Commonwealth
People from Cherkasy